The kwarta or quarter tax was a tax in Polish–Lithuanian Commonwealth on all incomes from crown estates in królewszczyzna (crown lands).  It was established in 1563.

Initially the rate was 1/4, hence the name, later 1/5. Its purpose was to maintain the Kwarta army. Later it was absorbed into the hiberna military-purpose tax.

References

Polish–Lithuanian Commonwealth
Legal history of Poland
Abolished taxes
1563 establishments in Europe
16th-century establishments in Poland